Shakurabad (also Romanized as Shakūrābād and Shokūrābād; also known as Shokrābād and Shukrabad) is a village in Guzal Darreh Rural District, Soltaniyeh District, Abhar County, Zanjan Province, Iran. At the 2006 census, its population was 743, in 182 families.

References 

Populated places in Abhar County